Zapatilla is a Spanish word for slippers or sneakers.

Zapatilla may also refer to:
 Zapatilla (mountain), a peak in the Pyrenees mountain
 Cayos Zapatilla, islands of Panama
 Biscúter